The brown creeper (Certhia americana), also known as the American treecreeper, is a small songbird, the only North American member of the treecreeper family Certhiidae.

Description
Adults are brown on the upper parts with light spotting, resembling a piece of tree bark, with white underparts. They have a long thin bill with a slight downward curve and a long stiff tail used for support as the bird creeps upwards. The male creeper has a slightly larger bill than the female. Brown creepers are smaller than white-breasted nuthatches but larger than golden-crowned kinglets.

Measurements:

 Length: 
 Weight: 
 Wingspan: 

Its voice includes single very high pitched, short, often insistent, piercing calls; see, or swee. The song often has a cadence like; pee pee willow wee or see tidle swee, with notes similar to the calls. Creepers in California have songs of four to nine syllables, except in the San Bernardino Mountains, where there are as many as nine to thirteen syllables per song, but within the same two second time frame.

This species's avoidance of edges, cryptic plumage, and high-pitched vocalizations contribute to a low survey detection rate compared to other species.

Distribution, habitat and range
Their breeding habitat is mature forests, especially conifers, in Canada, Alaska and the northeastern and western United States. They are permanent residents through much of their range; many northern birds migrate farther south to the United States. Brown creeper has occurred as a vagrant to Bermuda and Central America's mountains in Guatemala, Honduras and the northern cordillera of El Salvador. Since 1966 the brown creeper has experienced a yearly 1.5% population increase throughout the northeastern and northwestern (Pacific coast) regions of its range. The first breeding brown creepers in the Northwest Territories were detected inn 2008, in the Liard Valley, which may be a result of northern range expansion.

As a migratory species with a northern range, this species is a conceivable vagrant to western Europe. However, it is intermediate in its characteristics between common treecreeper and short-toed treecreeper, and has sometimes in the past been considered a subspecies of the former, although its closest relative seems to be the latter (Tietze et al., 2006). Since the two European treecreepers are themselves among the most difficult species on that continent to distinguish from each other, a brown creeper would probably not even be suspected, other than on a treeless western island, and would be difficult to verify even then.

Brown creepers prefer mature, moist, coniferous forests or mixed coniferous/deciduous forests. They are found in drier forests as well, including Engelman Spruce and larch forest in eastern Washington. They generally avoid the rainforest of the outer coast. While they generally nest in hardwoods, conifers are preferred for foraging.

Breeding brown creepers generally require trees of a large diameter, whose deeper bark furrows support large amounts of bark-dwelling invertebrates such as spiders to make up a foraging substratum. They also require continual renewal of snags, with a preference for Balsam Fir in their New Brunswick breeding range.

Brown creepers have been recorded breeding in the dry season (January–February) in Chalatenango Department, El Salvador, a behaviour unusual to insectivorous birds and shared in the region only by the golden-fronted woodpecker.

Subspecies
 Northern Group 
 Brown Creeper (C.a. alascensis)
 Brown Creeper (C.a. americana) 
 Brown Creeper (C.a. leucosticta)
 Brown Creeper (C.a. montana)
 Brown Creeper (C.a. nigrescens)
 Brown Creeper (C.a. occidentalis)
 Brown Creeper (C.a. phillipsi)
 Brown Creeper (C.a. stewarti)
 Brown Creeper (C.a. zelotes)
 Southern Group	
 Brown Creeper (C.a. alticola)
 Brown Creeper (C.a. guerrerensis)
 Brown Creeper (C.a. jaliscensis)
 Guatemalan Brown Creeper (C.a. pernigra)
 Honduran Brown Creeper (C.a. extima)
 Mexican Brown Creeper (C.a. albescens)

Conservation status
As with many of Washington's birds, the Cascades divide this species into two subspecies.
The species has declined in much of North America but appears to be doing well in Washington, with a small (not significant) increase on the state's breeding bird survey since 1966.

In Wyoming, brown creepers have been recognized as preferring habitat within large, intact and mature stands of spruces, firs, or lodgepole pine. It is therefore potentially vulnerable to logging, climate change, or replacement of those tree species by Ponderosa pine. However, it is not considered a species of serious concern in that state.

In New Brunswick, brown creepers have been shown to respond negatively to even moderate forestry. Conservation efforts in the province have focused on maintaining unmanaged patches with high densities of trees and snags in mature forest.

Ivory-billed woodcreepers (Xiphorhynchus flavigaster) have been observed extracting brown creeper nestlings and dropping them away from the nest.

Behavior
Brown creepers forage on tree trunks and branches, typically spiraling upwards from the bottom of a tree trunk, and then flying down to the bottom of another tree. They creep slowly with their body flattened against the bark, probing with their beak for insects. They will rarely feed on the ground. They mainly eat small arthropods found in the bark, but sometimes they will eat seeds in winter.

Breeding
Breeding season typically begins in April. The female will make a partial cup nest either under a piece of bark partially detached from the tree, or in a tree cavity. It will lay 3–7 eggs, and incubation lasts approximately two weeks. Both of the parents help feed the chicks. Parents both take turns feeding nestlings and removing fecal sacs from the nest.

Gallery

References

Further reading

 Yurgenson A. : birds.cornell.edu

External links

Brown Creeper - Certhia americana - USGS Patuxent Bird Identification InfoCenter
Brown Creeper Species Account - Cornell Lab of Ornithology
Brown creeper species account - Animal diversity web
 
 
 

brown creeper
Birds of North America
Native birds of Alaska
Birds of Canada
Fauna of the Sierra Nevada (United States)
brown creeper
Articles containing video clips
Taxa named by Charles Lucien Bonaparte